The bidding process for the UEFA Women's Euro 2025 will be the process by which the location for the 14th UEFA Women's Championship or commonly referred as UEFA Women's Euro 2025, will be selected.

Hosting requirements
Media agencies revealed on 11 November 2020, that the European football governing body UEFA will decide on the host of UEFA Women's Euro 2025 in December 2022. The application for hosting must be submitted no later than August 2022. The bidding concept for UEFA Euro 2024 was ratified on 1 February 2019.

The tournament is expected to continue the format of the 2017 and 2022 editions, with a total of 31 matches taking place for a duration of up to 25 days, with 16 teams competing in the tournament.

The requirements for the stadiums are as follows:
 6-8 stadiums with 8,000-20,000 seats 
 1 stadium with at least 20,000 seats (potential final hosting)
 4 quality training facilities per stadium
 4 hotels per stadium

Schedule

Bids
Eight European national associations signalled to UEFA their interest in staging UEFA Women's Euro 2025:

Confirmed bids

Poland 

On 3 June 2021, Zbigniew Boniek, head of the Polish Football Association, announced that the association had filed their bid at UEFA to host the 2025 Women's Championship, citing women's football as gaining in popularity in many European countries, including Poland. Poland hosted previously the Men's Euro in 2012 with Ukraine and the 2019 FIFA U-20 World Cup.

The following are the 10 host cities and stadiums selected for Poland's bid:

Wrocław – Stadion Wrocław, capacity 45,105
Gdańsk – Stadion Gdańsk, capacity 43,615
Kraków – Stadion Miejski im. Henryka Reymana, capacity 33,326
Warsaw – Stadion Wojska Polskiego, capacity 31,800
Białystok – Stadion Miejski (Białystok), capacity 22,386
Łódź – Stadion Miejski im. Władysława Króla, capacity 18,029
Lublin – Arena Lublin, capacity 15,500
Tychy – Stadion Miejski (Tychy), capacity 15,500
Gdynia – Stadion Miejski (Gdynia), capacity 15,139
Bielsko-Biała – Stadion Miejski (Bielsko-Biała), capacity 15,076

"Nordics 2025": Denmark, Finland, Norway, and Sweden

On 15 October 2021, the Danish Football Association, announced that the Nordic countries (Denmark, Finland, Norway, and Sweden) with support from Iceland and Faroe Islands, have confirmed their bids to host the UEFA Euro 2025. Following statement, where mentioned by president of the Danish Football Association (DBU) Jesper Møller saying, "We at DBU and in the Nordic football associations have very ambitious visions for the development of women's football. For four years, we have worked closely with our Nordic colleagues to create a strong bid for a final round. We are convinced that a Nordic host for the UEFA Euro 2025 will be fantastic for women's football - fans, players, stakeholders and UEFA".

Head of Women's Football Development Manager in the Finnish Football Association Heidi Pihlaja said in a press release: "The European Championship finals bid, together with the other Nordic countries, is a key part of our goal to strengthen football as a sport for women and girls". All four countries previously hosted the tournament in 1984, 1987, 1991, 1995, 1997, 2009 and 2013. If the bid is successful, it will be the second time in the history that four countries co-hosting one major football tournament, after the men's 2007 AFC Asian Cup (hosted by Indonesia, Malaysia, Thailand and Vietnam).

The following are the 9 host cities and stadiums selected for Nordic bid:
 Copenhagen – Parken Stadium, capacity 38,065
 Odense – Odense Stadium, capacity 15,633
 Helsinki – Helsinki Olympic Stadium, capacity 30,084
 Tampere – Tampere Stadion, capacity 16,800
 Oslo – Ullevaal Stadion, capacity 28,000
 Trondheim – Lerkendal Stadion, capacity 21,405
 Gothenborg – Gamla Ullevi, capacity 18,600
 Solna – Friends Arena, capacity 50,000
 Stockholm – Tele2 Arena, capacity 30,000

France

France has never hosted the UEFA Women's Euro before, but the French Football Federation declared its interest in hosting it for the first time in the country's history. If France is selected, it would mark six years after France hosted the FIFA Women's World Cup. Nevertheless, the country already hosted the 1960, 1984 and 2016 men's Euros, in which they can be used for the potential Women's Euro.

The following are the 8 host cities for France's bid:
Lyon - Parc Olympique Lyonnais, capacity 59,186
Paris - Parc des Princes, capacity 48,583
Lens - Stade Bollaert-Delelis, capacity 38,223
Nantes - Stade de la Beaujoire, capacity 37,473
Rennes - Roazhon Park, capacity 29,778
Metz - Stade Saint-Symphorien, capacity 26,700
Valenciennes - Stade du Hainaut, capacity 24,926
Reims - Stade Auguste-Delaune, capacity 21,684

Switzerland

Switzerland looks to host its first-ever UEFA Women's Euro in the country's history. the Swiss Football Association confirmed their interest in November 2021. If awarded, it would be seventeen years after Switzerland co-host the Men's Euro with Austria. On 23 March 2022, Liechtenstein Football Association joined the Swiss bid, which Hugo Quaderer, head of LFV, said: "Liechtenstein football fans have never had the opportunity to experience games for one of the most important cups in European football live, practically on their doorstep. We would therefore be very happy if Switzerland were awarded the contract with Vaduz as the venue." However, by September 2022 plans for Liechtenstein's part of the bid were scrapped.

The following are the 9 host cities and stadiums selected for Switzerland's bid:
Basel – St. Jakob-Park, capacity 38,512
Bern – Stadion Wankdorf, capacity 31,783
Geneva – Stade de Genève, capacity 30,084
Zürich – Letzigrund, capacity 26,104
St. Gallen – kybunpark, capacity 19,694
Lucerne – Swissporarena, capacity 16,800
Sion – Stade Tourbillon, capacity 16,263
Lausanne – Stade de la Tuilière, capacity 12,544 
Thun – Stockhorn Arena, capacity 10,398

Cancelled bids

Denmark 

In February 2019, the Danish Football Association stated its intention to bid, inspired by the recent success of the Denmark women's national football team. A joint bid with the other Nordic countries was also mentioned to be possible. Denmark hosted the UEFA Women's Euro 1991, with the host cities of Aalborg, Frederikshavn and Hjørring. As of July 2020, a bidding committee has already been set up to facilitate the Danish attempt to host the tournament. However, according to the president of the Danish Football Association Jesper Møller, there will also be a modernization of several of the Danish stadiums if the desire to apply should become a reality.

On 25 March 2021, the Danish regional television station TV 2/Fyn, announced that they given access to documents, through Odense Municipality, where it appears that 12 Danish cities would be potential host cities for the tournament in 2025. A timetable in the annexes states that the interested host cities have one year from now to decide whether they want to take their interest seriously.

The following are the 12 host cities and stadiums selected for Denmark's potential bid:

Copenhagen – Parken Stadium, capacity 38,065
Brøndby – Brøndby Stadium, capacity 29,000
Aarhus – Ceres Park, capacity 19,433
Esbjerg – Blue Water Arena, capacity 18,000
Odense – Nature Energy Park, capacity 15,790
Aalborg – Aalborg Portland Park, capacity 13,800
Herning – MCH Arena, capacity 11,423
Horsens – CASA Arena Horsens, capacity 10,400
Randers – Cepheus Park Randers, capacity 10,300
Haderslev – Sydbank Park, capacity 10,000
Silkeborg – JYSK Park, capacity 10,000
Viborg – Energi Viborg Arena, capacity 9,566

On 15 October 2021, the president of the Danish Football Association Jesper Møller announced on a press conference that his association abandoned its original plan to host the tournament independently and will focus on the plans for the Nordic candidacy.

Ukraine
Ukrainian Association of Football had decleared their interest in November 2021, It would mark the first time that Ukraine has hosted the tournament and would be thirteen years after hosting the Men's Euro with Poland. However, following the 2022 Russian invasion of Ukraine, the bidding plan of Ukraine was put to limbo due to fear of war and insecurity.

External links
 Nordics 2025 bid website
 Switzerland 2025 bid info on Swiss Football Association website

References

2025